Vonones ornatus is a species of armoured harvestman in the family Cosmetidae. It is found in North America.

References

Further reading

 

Cosmetidae
Articles created by Qbugbot
Animals described in 1821